"Do You Feel Me" is a radio-only single by American R&B/soul singer, Anthony Hamilton. The song written by Diane Warren and produced by production team The Bomb Squad member Hank Shocklee, was featured in the soundtrack to the 2007 film American Gangster.
The song was ranked number forty-six on Rolling Stones list of the "100 Best Songs of 2007".

It was released to US urban AC radios on October 2, 2007.

References

External links
Official website
Biography & booking information

Anthony Hamilton Jet Mag Interview

2007 singles
Anthony Hamilton (musician) songs
Songs written by Diane Warren
2007 songs
Def Jam Recordings singles